Ihor Malysh (born 15 July 1983) is a professional Ukrainian former football midfielder.

Playing career 
Malysh is a product of the Kovel-Volyn Sportive School System, and began his professional career in 2000 in the Ukrainian Second League with FC Podillya Khmelnytskyi. In 2001, he played in the Ukrainian First League with FC Volyn Lutsk, and featured with the reserve team FC Kovel-Volyn Kovel in the Ukrainian Second League. In 2003, the team secured promotion as a result he featured in the Ukrainian Premier League. The following season he played abroad in the Belarusian Premier League with FC Neman Grodno. During his tenure in Grodno he featured in the 2005 UEFA Intertoto Cup against Tescoma Zlín.

After a season abroad he returned to the Ukrainian First League, and played with FC Obolon Kyiv. He later played with FC Zakarpattia Uzhgorod, and FC Krymteplytsia Molodizhne. In 2012, he went abroad for the second time to play in the Israeli Premier League with Maccabi Petah Tikva F.C. He returned to the Ukrainian First League the following year, and had stints with FC Avanhard Kramatorsk, Nyva Ternopil, FC Naftovyk-Ukrnafta Okhtyrka, and FC Mykolaiv. In 2016, he played in the Ukrainian Second League with NK Veres Rivne, before returning to Avanhard Kramatorsk in 2016.

After his release from Avanhard he began his third spell abroad in the Canadian Soccer League with FC Ukraine United. In his debut season in Toronto he assisted in securing the First Division title.

Honors

FC Ukraine United 
 Canadian Soccer League First Division (1): 2018

References

External links
 
 
 

1983 births
Living people
Ukrainian footballers
Association football midfielders
Ukrainian expatriate footballers
Expatriate footballers in Belarus
Expatriate footballers in Israel
Ukrainian Premier League players
FC Podillya Khmelnytskyi players
FC Volyn Lutsk players
FC Kovel-Volyn Kovel players
FC Neman Grodno players
FC Obolon-Brovar Kyiv players
FC Obolon-2 Kyiv players
FC Hoverla Uzhhorod players
FC Krymteplytsia Molodizhne players
Maccabi Petah Tikva F.C. players
FC Kramatorsk players
FC Nyva Ternopil players
FC Naftovyk-Ukrnafta Okhtyrka players
MFC Mykolaiv players
NK Veres Rivne players
FC Ukraine United players
Ukrainian First League players
Belarusian Premier League players
Israeli Premier League players
Canadian Soccer League (1998–present) players
Ukrainian Second League players